Grass 2 Grace is 2face Idibia's second solo album. The album won him numerous awards, including a MOBO award in 2007. It has hits like See me so, True love, If love is a crime, For Instance, etc.

Track listing

 "Intro (Skit)" (Innocent Ujah Idibia) – 1:15
 "One Love" (Innocent Ujah Idibia) - 3:51
 "No Shaking" (Innocent Ujah Idibia) – 4:31
 "I Dey Feel Like" (Innocent Ujah Idibia) – 4:21
 "See Me So" (Innocent Ujah Idibia) – 4:40
 "Skit (Story)" (Innocent Ujah Idibia) – 0:30
 "E B Like Say" featuring Soul E (Innocent Ujah Idibia) – 4:46
 "True Love" (Innocent Ujah Idibia and 2me) – 4:21
 "4 Instance" (Innocent Ujah Idibia) – 3:47
 "If Love Is A Crime" (Innocent Ujah Idibia) – 4:29
 "OCHO" (Innocent Ujah Idibia) – 4:18
 "My Love" featuring VIP (Abdul Hamidu "Lazzy" Ibrahim, Emmanuel "Promzy" Ababio, Joseph Nana "Prodigal" Ofori, Innocent Ujah Idibia)  – 5:33
 "Outro Skit" (Innocent Ujah Idibia) - 0:10

Singles
No Shaking
See Me So
4 Instance

External

2006 albums
2face Idibia albums
2006 in Nigerian music